Richard Edensor Heathcote (1780–1850) was a British industrialist and politician.

The son of Sir John Edensor Heathcote of Longton Hall.  He was elected the Member of Parliament (MP) for Coventry in 1826 and at about the same time rebuilt Apedale Hall, near Newcastle-under-Lyme in Staffordshire, in the Elizabethan style.  He died in Genoa, Italy, in 1850.

His grandson Captain Justinian H. Edwards-Heathcote was the father of Katharine Maud Edwards-Heathcote, mother of Oswald Mosley, the founder of the British Union of Fascists, who lived for a time at Apedale Hall.

References
 John Ward, The Borough of Stoke on Trent in the Commencement of the Reign of Queen Victoria (1848), p. 562
   The History of the County of Stafford, Volume 8 (1963) p 224. The History of Longton from British History Online

External links 
 

1780 births
1850 deaths
English industrialists
Members of the Parliament of the United Kingdom for English constituencies
UK MPs 1826–1830
Members of Parliament for Coventry
19th-century British businesspeople